Lance Hamilton Murray (13 April 1921 – 21 October 2012) was a Trinidad cricketer who played three matches of first-class cricket between 1956 and 1960. He was the father of the West Indies Test cricketer Deryck Murray.

He became a prominent cricket administrator, and served as director of the West Indies Cricket Board. He was inducted into the Trinidad and Tobago Sports Hall of Fame in 1995 for his work as a sports administrator. He was awarded Trinidad and Tobago's Chaconia Gold Medal and Medal of Merit.

He was also a football player and coach.

References

External links
 

1921 births
2012 deaths
Trinidad and Tobago cricketers
North Trinidad cricketers
Recipients of the Chaconia Medal